is a Japanese anime television series created, written, and directed by Yuzuru Tachikawa and produced by Madhouse. The series spawned from a short film, Death Billiards, which was originally produced by Madhouse for the Young Animator Training Project's Anime Mirai 2013 and released in March 2013. The television series aired in Japan between January and March 2015. It is licensed in North America by Funimation and in the United Kingdom by Anime Limited, the latter of which was eventually cancelled. The series was obtained by Madman Entertainment for digital distribution in Australia and New Zealand.

Plot
Whenever someone dies, they are sent to one of many mysterious bars run by bartenders serving as arbiters inside a tower in the afterlife. There, they must compete in Death Games with their souls on the line, the results of which reveal what secrets led them to their situation and what their fate will be afterwards, with the arbiters judging if their souls will either be sent for reincarnation or banished into the void. The series follows Decim, the lone bartender of the bar where people who died at the same time are sent to, known as the Quindecim bar, and his assistant.

Characters

Main characters
 
 
 The bartender of the Quindecim bar (located on the 15th floor) who oversees the Death Games between people who have died and must be judged. His hobby is making mannequins that resemble guests who have made an impression on him. He is supposed to have no human emotions, just like all arbiters who are referred to as dummies because they have never lived or died. As a risky experiment, Nona allows him to develop his interest in learning about human emotions.
  
 
She works as an assistant at Quindecim, learning the methods that arbiters use to judge human souls and helping Decim learn about human behavior.

Other Arbiters

Decim's boss, with the appearance of a young girl. She reports to Oculus and manages the arbiters, primarily working on the 90th floor and sometimes overseeing the games.

An arbiter bartender who runs and oversees death games in the Viginti Bar on the 20th floor. He does not get along well with Decim and disapproves of his reliance on Chiyuki, although their relationship is not antagonistic.

An ever helpful elevator attendant who is always smiling.

A member of the information bureau who ran the Quindecim bar before Decim took her place after she moved into the information center.

A woman in a skull helmet who oversees deaths across the world and decides which souls are sent to which arbiters.

A powerful being with a lotus-like beard and hair who is close to god and manages the arbiter system. He spends his free time playing galactic pool.

Players

He appeared in "Death Billards" as a cocky young man in his 30s who came in before Roujin at Quindecim. He and Roujin were forced to play a game of billiards that would decide their fate. In the midst of the game, he was completely surprised when he underestimated Roujin who, at his advance age, was already beating him in the game and was able to defend himself after he lunged at him with a cue stick. After the confrontation, he was able to recall that he is already dead and that he died at the hands of his girlfriend who murdered him after he cheated on her. At the end of the game, he and Roujin both were led to the elevator to reincarnation and the void, respectively.

He appeared in "Death Billards" who died of natural causes. He arrived in the Quindecim after Otoko, where they were both made to play a game of billiards that would decide their fate. Unlike Otoko, who is cocky and aggressive, he is calm and level-headed. Even when in the face of a confrontation with the latter, he was able to defend himself from Otoko's assault. At the end of the game, they were led to the elevator by Decim where it was not known as to what their fate has become. Before entering the elevator, he whispered something to Decim whose details are unknown. In the final scene, he was seen with a smirk on his face as he has been sent to the void.

The first to play the game. He and his wife Machiko enter a darts game with their lives staked on it. After suspecting Machiko had an affair, he sets out to win the game, later learning his suspicions and jealousy drove him and his wife to their deaths. He ends up losing but Decim decides to send his soul for reincarnation rather than into the void.

The first to play the game. She and her husband Takashi play a game of darts, believing their lives staked on it. After admitting to committing an affair and claiming that she married Takashi for his money, she landed the winning shot. Takashi tries to attack her to be stopped by Decim. Although she wins the game, Decim decides to sends her soul to the void. It is later suggested that she lied about her baby being another man's child to lessen Takashi's guilt about having killed his own baby, implying that she did truly love him. Although Chiyuki notices this, it was too late for Decim to reverse his judgment. It is later revealed that Machiko cheated, but the assistant (black-haired girl) suggests that Takashi's jealousy had driven his poor wife to commit something she would forever regret. Her husband's constant jealousy and mistrust towards her lead to her cheating out of frustration, something which she regretted immensely.

He is a college student who awakens at Quindecim and reunites with his childhood friend Mai. He plays Death Bowling against her, later learning that they died in a bus accident together.

A part-time attendant at the bowling alley where Miura and his friends often played. It is revealed that she was childhood friends with Miura.

A childhood friend of Miura and Mai who moved away. Mai initially claims to be Chisato, when she meets Miura at Quindecim.

She is the hostess of a reality television show. Misaki's explicit relationship at a young age leads to an unexpected pregnancy with an abusive man. She attempted to raise her five children despite the mishaps of her multiple failed relationships. She was strangled to death by her talent manager in a fit of rage after she slapped and antagonized her. 

Yousuke's parents had a divorce and his father remarried. However, Yousuke refused to accept his new mother and avoided her at home, eventually committing suicide. He is placed in a Death Game against Misaki where they must fight in an arcade game.

An excitable high school girl who died after slipping on a bar of soap. She is sent to the Viginti where she plays a game of twister against Harada. Unlike the other guests, she ends up staying at the Viginti instead of passing on. Ginti later on presents her with Harada's soul-less body, telling her that it is possible to revive him, but it would require sending another young man's soul into the void in his place. It is not shown what she chooses to do, however she is shown to be bringing Harada's body with her to retrieve his soul. Ginti was originally going to reincarnate her, however changed her to the void after she insisted she lived for Harada and would want to be with him. As they enter the void, Harada manages to be revived for a brief moment before both their souls fall into the void, visually joining as one, reducing their bodies back into the mannequins they originally were.

A male idol who was part of the boy band C.H.A., who plays against Mayu at the Viginti. After causing a fan to commit suicide after breaking up with her, Harada was killed by a timer bomb given to him by his girlfriend, who was that girl's sister. His soul-less body makes a comeback in episode 11, eventually revealing that his soul has been sent to the void. Mayu, believing she was given a choice to revive him, is tricked by Ginti into joining his soul in the void. The two orbs of light representing the two's souls merge into one as they fall into the void, possibly indicating a literal joining of souls.

Together with Tatsumi, he arrived at Quindecim, where they both have to fight in a game of air hockey that would decide their fate. Prior to the game, he finds a bloodied knife in his bag with no idea as to why he had it. During the game he recalls that he has a sister named Sae who was violently raped by a stalker and that he was able to kill the stalker with the knife from before, but was mortally wounded during the struggle. He then killed whom he thought to be the stalker's "accomplice", not knowing it was Tatsumi. He later remembers that he died from the loss of blood from the fatal wound he sustained earlier. In the last phases of the game he realizes that the one he thought was the accomplice was actually Tatsumi who went there to kill the stalker as well. He becomes extremely enraged when he learns that Tatsumi, a detective, actually witnessed his sister's assault but did nothing to save her. Despite Chiyuki's attempts to lessen his guilt, he gave in to Tatsumi's taunts. At the end of the game it is suggested that both he and Tatsumi were sent to the void.

He arrived with Shimada at Quindecim, where they have to fight in a game of air hockey. He was a detective whose wife had been brutally murdered. After tracking down and killing the culprit, he began a string of vigilantism where he monitors suspicious people before executing them should they commit a crime, hence he witnessed Sae Shimada's rape and was deduced by her to be an accomplice involved in the assault. Arriving at the stalker's house later, he found the stalker already dead before being fatally stabbed by Shimada, who assumed he was the "accomplice" his sister mentioned. He died of blood loss just as Shimada passed out from his own fatal wound. At the end of the game it is suggested that both he and Shimada were sent to the void.

A lone guest who was sent to Quindecim so as to judge hers and the black-haired woman's souls in a game of Old Maid. She was a story book illustrator and the wife of the elderly man from Death Billiards. Chancing upon a card illustrated with a character she never got to draw, she deduced that she was dead, despite not remembering how she died nor does she want to learn it, thankful that she has seen her illustration come to life. Later on as she witnesses cards with illustrations from the Chavvot story, she explains the story and the author's feelings that went into it, which allowed the woman to recall part of her childhood memories and her name, Chiyuki. After the end of the game she is sent to be reincarnated.

Media

Death Billiards
 was produced by Madhouse as part of the Young Animator Training Project's Anime Mirai 2013 project, which funds young animators, alongside other short films by Trigger, Zexcs and Gonzo. Death Billiards and the other shorts each received 38 million yen from the Japanese Animation Creators Association, who receives funding from the Japanese government's Agency for Cultural Affairs. The short was created, directed and written by Yuzuru Tachikawa. The short, along with the other Anime Mirai shorts, opened in 14 Japanese theatres on March 2, 2013.

Death Parade
An anime television series based on the short, titled Death Parade, aired in Japan on Nippon TV between January 9, 2015, and March 27, 2015. Produced by NTV, VAP and Madhouse, the series is created, written and directed by Yuzuru Tachikawa, with Shinichi Kurita designing the characters and Yuki Hayashi composing the music. The opening theme is "Flyers" by Bradio while the ending theme is "Last Theater" by NoisyCell. The anime is licensed in North America by Funimation, who simulcast the series as it aired. It was also acquired in the United Kingdom by Anime Limited, however, it was later announced that the release was cancelled and delisted. A broadcast dub version began streaming from February 18, 2015, both on Funimation's website and a Dubbletalk programming block which is streamed on Twitch.

Reception
Death Parade won the 2016 Anime Trending Awards in the "Best Original Anime" category and was nominated for their "Anime of the Year", "Supernatural Anime of the Year", "Mystery or Psychological Anime of the Year" and "Opening Theme Song of the Year" categories. A poll done on the Japanese video-sharing service Niconico at the end of the Winter 2015 airing anime season, ranked Death Parade 9th as the users favorite anime of that season. The English dubbed version of the anime had nominations for "Best male lead vocal performance in an anime television series/OVA" and "Best female lead vocal performance in an anime television series/OVA" and it won the "Best vocal ensemble in an anime television series/OVA" for the BTVA Anime Dub Television/OVA Voice Acting Awards. IGN listed Death Parade among the best anime series of the 2010s.

Notes

References

External links
 Death Billiards
 Death Billiards at Anime Mirai 
 Death Billiards at Madhouse  
 
 
 Death Parade
 Official website 
 Death Parade at NTV 
 

2010s animated short films
2015 anime television series debuts
Anime short films
Battle royale
Battle royale anime and manga
Fiction about death games
Funimation
Madhouse (company) franchises
2010s Japanese-language films
Madhouse (company)
Nippon TV original programming
Psychological thriller anime and manga